The 2015–16 Loyola Marymount Lions men's basketball team represented Loyola Marymount University during the 2015–16 NCAA Division I men's basketball season. The Lions were led by second year head coach Mike Dunlap. The Lions competed in the West Coast Conference and played their home games at Gersten Pavilion. They finished the season 14–17, 6–12 in WCC play to finish in a three way tie for seventh place. They defeated San Diego in the first round of the WCC tournament to advance to the quarterfinals where they lost to Saint Mary's.

Previous season
The Lions finished the season 8–23, 4–14 in WCC play to finish in a tie for ninth place. They lost in the first round of the WCC tournament to Santa Clara.

Departures

Incoming transfers

Recruits

Roster

Schedule and results

|-
!colspan=12 style=| Exhibition

|-
!colspan=12 style=| Non-conference regular season

|-
!colspan=12 style=| WCC regular season

|-
!colspan=12 style=| WCC tournament

References

Loyola Marymount Lions men's basketball seasons
Loyola Marymount